The 2016–17 Marshall Thundering Herd men's basketball team represented Marshall University during the 2016–17 NCAA Division I men's basketball season. The Thundering Herd, led by third-year head coach Dan D'Antoni, played their home games at the Cam Henderson Center and were members of Conference USA. They finished the season 20–15, 10–8 in C-USA play to finish in sixth place. They defeated Florida Atlantic, Old Dominion, and Louisiana Tech to advance to the championship game of the C-USA tournament. There they lost to top-seeded Middle Tennessee. Despite finishing with 20 wins, they did not participate in a postseason tournament.

On January 24, 2017, assistant coach Chris Duhon resigned following an arrest for driving on a revoked license three days earlier.

Previous season
The Thundering Herd finished the 2015–16 season 17–16, 12–6 in C-USA play to finish in a three-way tie for third place. They defeated UTEP in the quarterfinals of the C-USA tournament before losing in the semifinals to Middle Tennessee.

Preseason 
The Thundering Herd was picked to finish in fourth place in the preseason Conference USA poll. Jon Elmore and Ryan Taylor were selected to the preseason All-Conference USA team.

Offseason

Departures

Incoming Transfers

Recruiting

Roster

Schedule and results 

|-
!colspan=9 style=| Exhibition

|-
!colspan=9 style=| Non-conference regular season

|-
!colspan=9 style=| Conference USA regular season

|-
!colspan=9 style=| Conference USA tournament

References

Marshall Thundering Herd men's basketball seasons
Marshall
Marsh
Marsh